Ga-Motlagomo is a settlement in Limpopo, South Africa. According to the 2011 census, its population is 512, all of whom are Black Africans. 97.26% of its inhabitants, or all but 15, speak Sepedi as their first language. Its name is also spelled Ga-Motlakgomo or simply Motlakgomo.

References

Populated places in the Capricorn District Municipality